The Camarinal Sill is the sill separating the Mediterranean Sea and the Atlantic Ocean. This threshold is the shallowest seafloor pass between the Iberian Peninsula and Africa.

Its formation is linked to the Zanclean flood and the termination of the Messinian salinity crisis, when the Mediterranean was abruptly refilled through the Strait of Gibraltar, excavating the 900-metre-deep gorge that lies underneath the water. A competing hypothesis suggests that both the gorge and the Camarinal Sill are the result of fluvial erosion during the desiccation of the Mediterranean (Messinian salinity crisis).

Marine waters must climb to that depth when flowing between both ocean domains. During World War II, submarines used the upper inflow current and the lower outflow current to go in and out of the Mediterranean Sea without using their engines, to avoid being noticed from the surface.

References 

Strait of Gibraltar
Messinian
Aquatic sills